Los Justicieros, "The Avengers", was an anarchist paramilitary group created in 1920 in San Sebastián, Basque Region, during the years of pistolerismo. The group was created by Buenaventura Durruti, Suberviola, Ruiz, Aldabatrecu and Marcelino del Campo among others. In 1921, during the inauguration of the Great Kursaal in San Sebastian, members of this group attempted unsuccessfully to assassinate King Alfonso XIII. The group was succeeded by Los Solidarios, another anarchist armed group.

Bibliography 
 Bookchin (Murray). Los anarquistas españoles: los años heroicos, 1868-1936. Faximil Edicions Digitals. 2000. 457p. 
 de Paz (Pedro). El hombre que mató a Durruti. Literaturas Comunicacion SL. 2011. 
 Paz (Abel). Durruti in the Spanish Revolution; Chapter IV: Los Justicieros. AK Press. 2007. 795p.

See also
Buenaventura Durruti
Anarchism
Los Solidarios
Pistolerismo

References 

Defunct anarchist militant groups
Anarchist organisations in Spain
Left-wing militant groups in Spain
Defunct anarchist organizations in Europe